The men's 3000 metres steeplechase event at the 2015 Summer Universiade was held on 9 July at the Gwangju Universiade Main Stadium.

Results

References

3000
2015